David van Gelder (born 4 January 1940) is an Israeli former fencer. He competed in the individual sabre event at the 1960 Summer Olympics at the age of 20. He was eliminated in round one, after losing all his five bouts.

References

External links
 

1940 births
Living people
Israeli male sabre fencers
Olympic fencers of Israel
Fencers at the 1960 Summer Olympics
20th-century Israeli people